Gopalganj is a town, municipality and headquarters of Gopalganj district in the Indian state of Bihar.

Geography
It is located at coordinates   Latitude and longitude. Gandaki River, which often causes flooding, flows southwards.

Demographics
 2011 Census of India, Gopalganj town had a population of 67,339, of which 34,603 are males while 32,736 are females. Population within the age group of 0 to 6 years was 10017 which is 14.88 % of total population of Gopalganj town. Female Sex Ratio is of 946 against state average of 918 and Child Sex Ratio in Gopalganj town is around 927 compared to Bihar state average of 935. Literacy rate of Gopalganj city is 80.66 % higher than state average of 61.80 % with male literacy of 86.92 % and female literacy rate of 74.07 %.

Religion 
Majority of the people follow Hinduism (79.91%), followed by Islam (19.67%). Small populations of followers of Christian, Sikhism, Buddhism are also present in the town.

Transport

Roads 
State highways and Road Link district headquarters at Gopalganj to all 14 blocks. National Highway 27 passes through Gopalganj to Mehsi, Muzaffarpur.

Railway 
Connected by Rail with a station at Gopalganj.

Radio stations
Radio Varsha, 90.8 MHz, Rajeev Nagar, Gopalganj.

Radio Rimjhim, 90.4 Mhz, Banjari Mor, Gopalganj

Notable people

References

Cities and towns in Gopalganj district, India